The 2001 Rugby Canada Super League season was the fourth season for the RCSL (Rugby Canada Super League).

Standings
Western Division
{| class="wikitable" style="text-align: center;"
|-
! width="250"|Team
! width="20"|Pld
! width="20"|W
! width="20"|D
! width="20"|L
! width="20"|F
! width="20"|A
! width="25"|+/-
! width="20"|BP
! width="20"|Pts
|-
|align=left| Fraser Valley Venom
|5||5||0||0||128||84||+44||0||20
|-
|align=left| Vancouver Island Crimson Tide
|5||4||0||1||150||86||+64||1||17
|-
|align=left| Saskatchewan Prairie Fire
|5||3||0||2||143||98||+45||1||13
|-
|align=left| Edmonton Gold
|5||2||0||3||108||145||-37||0||8
|-
|align=left| Manitoba Buffalo
|5||1||0||4||81||134||-53||1||5
|-
|align=left| Calgary Mavericks
|5||0||0||5||79||134||-55||2||2
|}

Eastern Division
{| class="wikitable" style="text-align: center;"
|-
! width="250"|Team
! width="20"|Pld
! width="20"|W
! width="20"|D
! width="20"|L
! width="20"|F
! width="20"|A
! width="25"|+/-
! width="20"|BP
! width="20"|Pts
|-
|align=left| Toronto Renegades
|4||4||0||0||143||54||+89||0||16
|-
|align=left| Newfoundland Rock
|4||3||0||1||94||43||+51||0||12
|-
|align=left| Nova Scotia Keltics
|4||2||0||2||48||75||-27||0||8
|-
|align=left| New Brunswick Black Spruce
|4||1||0||3||59||111||-52||1||5
|-
|align=left| Montreal Menace
|4||0||0||4||70||111||-41||2||2
|}

Note: A bonus point was awarded for a loss of 7 points or less

Championship final

The Fraser Valley Venom (Western Division champions) defeated the Toronto Renegades (Eastern Division Champions) 20-14 in the Championship Final, played in Surrey, British Columbia on 28 July 2001.

References

Rugby Canada Super League seasons
RCSL Season
2001 in Canadian rugby union